Tayama (written:  lit. "ricefield mountain") is a Japanese surname. Notable people with the surname include:

, Japanese triathlete
, Japanese writer
, Japanese skeleton racer

See also
Tayama Station, a railway station in Hachimantai, Iwate Prefecture, Japan

Japanese-language surnames